Chitrāngada (citrāngada) was the king of Kuru Mahajanapada  with his capital  Hastinapura . He belonged to the Lunar Dynasty of Bharata Tribe  He was the elder son of Shantanu and Satyavati, who ascended the throne of Hastinapura after his father's death.

Life as a warrior 

Following the wishes of queen Satyavati, Bhishma had placed Chitrangada on the throne of the kingdom of the Kurus after Shantanu's departure. Chitrangada was a great warrior and defeated many powerful enemies and Asuras. Finally, the king of the Gandharvas, who was his namesake, came to challenge him. A fierce battle took place between the two warriors on the bank of the river Hiranyavati, lasting three years. In the end the king of the Gandharvas defeated the Kuru king and killed him. After having performed the rites of the dead, Bhishma immediately consecrated Chitrangada's younger brother Vichitravirya to the kingdom.

References

Bibliography 

 Citrangada in: M.M.S. Shastri Chitrao, Bharatavarshiya Prachin Charitrakosha (Dictionary of Ancient Indian Biography, in Hindi), Pune 1964, p. 213
 J.A.B. van Buitenen, Mahabharata, vol. 1, The University of Chicago Press, 1973

External links
 Persons and Stories from Mahabharata

Characters in the Mahabharata